Neil Budworth (born 10 March 1982) is a former Wales international rugby league footballer who finished his career playing for the Mackay Cutters.

Background
Budworth was born in Higher End, Wigan, Greater Manchester, England.

Career
He previously played for the London Broncos/Harlequins RL in the Super League competition and was one of their longest serving players.

References

External links
(archived by web.archive.org) Mackay Cutters profile

1982 births
Living people
Crusaders Rugby League players
English rugby league players
English people of Welsh descent
London Broncos players
Mackay Cutters players
People from Higher End
Rugby league hookers
Rugby league players from Wigan
Wales national rugby league team players